Catherine Coquery-Vidrovitch (born 25 November 1935 in Paris) is a French historian and Africanist. She is professor emeritus at Paris Diderot University.

Biography 
She graduated from the École normale supérieure de Sèvres in 1959. She earned her third cycle doctorate from the École pratique des hautes études in 1966.
She was a fellow at the Woodrow Wilson International Center for Scholars in Washington D.C. in 1987, at the Shelby Cullom Davis Center for Historical Studies at Princeton University in 1992, and at the Humanities Research Center, University of Canberra at the University of Canberra in 1995.

Her research deals with Africa: the political issues of colonization as well as the idea of imperialism and capitalism in Africa.

References

External links

1935 births
Living people
Grand Officers of the Ordre national du Mérite
Commandeurs of the Légion d'honneur
Historians of slavery
Historians of Africa
21st-century French historians
20th-century French historians
French women historians
20th-century French women writers
21st-century French women writers
French Africanists
Historians of the Republic of the Congo